The Billboard Hot 100 is a chart that ranks the best-performing singles of the United States. Published by Billboard magazine, the data are compiled by Nielsen SoundScan based collectively on each single's weekly physical sales and airplay. There were ten singles that peaked atop the charts, but if "Un-Break My Heart" is excluded from the count (for the song started its peak in the previous year), the total would be nine. The longest running number-one single of 1997 is "Candle in the Wind 1997"/"Something About the Way You Look Tonight", which logged 14 weeks at the top of the Billboard Hot 100. Two of those weeks were logged in 1998 while the remaining 12 were attained in 1997.

With "Honey" becoming her 12th #1 single, Mariah Carey broke the record for most #1 songs by a female artist, surpassing Madonna and Whitney Houston with 11 each.

That year, 7 acts earned their first number one song, such as Spice Girls, Puff Daddy, Mase, The Notorious B.I.G., Hanson, Faith Evans, and 112. The Notorious B.I.G. became the fifth artist to hit number one posthumously, after his death in March 1997. Puff Daddy, Mase, and The Notorious B.I.G. were the only artists to hit number one more than once, with Puff Daddy hitting the most with three, while Mase and The Notorious B.I.G. hit twice.

Chart history

Number-one artists

See also
1997 in music

References

Additional sources
Fred Bronson's Billboard Book of Number 1 Hits, 5th Edition
Joel Whitburn's Top Pop Singles 1955-2008, 12 Edition
Joel Whitburn Presents the Billboard Hot 100 Charts: The Nineties
Additional information obtained can be verified within Billboard's online archive services and print editions of the magazine.

1997 record charts
1997